

Events 
 January–March 
 January 15 – James Macrae, a former captain of a freighter for the British East India Company, is hired by the Company to administer the Madras Presidency (at the time, the "Presidency of Fort St. George"), and begins major reforms.  At the time, the area administered is most of Southern India, including what is now the Indian state of Andhra Pradesh, parts the states of Tamil Nadu, Kerala, Karnataka, Telangana, Odisha and the union territory of Lakshadweep. 
 January 20 – James Figg hosts the first recorded international boxing match, fought between English livestock drover Bob Whitaker and Venetian gondolier Alberto di Carni in London.
 January 25 – The Spanish corsair Amaro Pargo receives the title of Hidalgo (nobleman).
 January – In Japan, the policy of the Gonin-gumi organizing groups of every five households in a town into units collectively responsible for the good behavior of everyone in the unit, goes into effect as the register of units is completed by the Tokugawa shogunate. 
 February 8 – (January 28 Old Style) Catherine I becomes Empress of Russia, on the death of her husband, Peter the Great. 
 February 20 – The first reported case of white men scalping Native Americans takes place in New Hampshire colony.
 March 2 – In London, a night watchman finds a severed head by the River Thames; it is later recognized to be that of the husband of Catherine Hayes. She and an accomplice are later executed.
 March 30 – The second performance of Johann Sebastian Bach's St John Passion, BWV 245 (including 5 movements from his Weimarer Passion), takes place at St. Thomas Church, Leipzig.

 April–June 
 April 30 – Charles VI, Holy Roman Emperor and King Philip V of Spain sign the Treaty of Vienna.
 May 12 – The Black Watch is raised as a military company, as part of the pacification of the Scottish Highlands under General George Wade.
 May 21 – On the day of the grand wedding of her daughter Anna to the Duke of Holstein-Gottorp, Empress Catherine I of Russia creates the Order of Saint Alexander Nevsky 
 May 24 – Jonathan Wild, fraudulent Thief-Taker General, is hanged at Tyburn in London, for actually aiding criminals.
 June 23 – The Malt tax riots begin in Scotland in Hamilton, South Lanarkshire, after the price of beer and scotch whiskey increases.  Earlier in the year, the British government extended the taxes in England  on malted grain to brewers and distilleries in Scotland.  The rioting then spreads throughout Scot counties.  
 June 24 – The Grand Lodge of Ireland in Dublin holds its first recorded meeting, making it the second most senior Grand Lodge in world Freemasonry, and the oldest in continuous existence.

 July–September 
 July 8 – Mattheus de Haan becomes the new Governor-General of the Dutch East Indies (now Indonesia), governing until his death on June 1, 1729 in Batavia (now Jakarta).
 July 15 – Sir Richard Everard becomes the 4th Governor of North Carolina.
 August 15 – The civil marriage of King Louis XV of France and Princess Maria Leszczyńska of Poland is held at Strasbourg.  The King is not present, and his cousin, the Duke of Orléans, serves as his proxy. 
 August 27 – At least 216 people die in the sinking of the Chameau, a ship of the French Navy, after the vessel is driven by a storm into rocks off of the coast of Nova Scotia.  Reportedly, 180 bodies wash ashore near Louisbourg.  The ship's cargo, which included a fortune in gold and silver coins, is discovered 240 years later in 1965.
 September 5 – The day after they meet for the first time, the wedding ceremony of King Louis and Marie takes place in Fontainebleau, making her the Queen Consort of France.  Their marriage lasts for almost 43 years until her death in 1768.
 September 16 – The Treaty of Hanover is signed between Great Britain, France and Prussia.

 October–December 
 October 19 – Johan Paul Schagen in appointed by the Dutch East India Company to serve as the Governor of Ceylon after the death of Johannes Hertenberg. 
 October 23 – Russia dispatches 1,500 troops and 120 civilians to Russia's border with China, on a mission to survey the boundaries in order to make a treaty with the Chinese Empire.  Serbian adventurer Sava Vladislavich leads a group of cartographers to prepare maps in advance of traveling on to Beijing.
 November 5 – The fourth and final treaty of the 1725 Peace of Vienna is signed to create an alliance between Austria and Spain.
 November 8 – The first newspaper in the Province of New York, the New-York Gazette, is introduced by William Bradford as a weekly publication.
 November 22 – Chief Chicagou of the Mitchigamea tribe, and chiefs of five other tribes of the Illini Confederation, are received as guests of King Louis XV in Paris.  Chicagou pledges the Illini's support of the French presence in North America.
 November 26 – British astronomers James Bradley and Samuel Molyneux set up a telescope in Molyneux's private observatory to begin their observations of stellar parallax of the star Gamma Draconis.   The observations, which start on December 3, lead to Bradley's pioneering discovery of the aberration of light.
 December 12 – Johan Willem Ripperda of the Netherlands, the former Dutch Ambassador to Spain, arrives in Madrid and claims that King Philip V has appointed him as the new Prime Minister.  The bluff is successful and he is granted authority by the King's advisers, but after four months, he is forced to resign.
 December 15 – A treaty is signed by chiefs of four member tribes of the Wabanaki Confederacy (the Abenaki, Pequawket, Mi'kmaq, Maliseet) and representatives of three British provinces in North America (Massachusetts Bay, New Hampshire and Nova Scotia) and their allies, the Mohawk nation, bringing an end to Dummer's War, named for acting Massachusetts Bay Governor William Dummer.

 Date unknown 
 The Terengganu Sultanate is established at Terengganu Darul Iman (now known as Terengganu Darul Iman, Malaysia).
 A fire in Wapping, London, destroys 70 houses.
 In Qing dynasty China, 66 copies of a 5,020 volume-long encyclopedia, the Gujin Tushu Jicheng (Complete Collection of Illustrations and Writings from the Earliest to Current Times) are printed, necessitating the crafting of 250,000 movable type characters cast in bronze.
 Freemasonry is established in France, as an English import.
 The Four Seasons, a set of violin concertos by Antonio Vivaldi, is published.
 Gradus ad Parnassum, a seminal work on counterpoint, laying out rules of constructing music, is published by Johann Joseph Fux

Births 

 January 25 – Antoine Court de Gébelin, French pastor (d. 1784)
 February 4 – Dru Drury, English entomologist (d. 1803)
 February 5
 James Otis, American lawyer, patriot (d. 1783)
 Anna Maria Rückerschöld, Swedish author (d. 1805)
 February 15 – Abraham Clark, American signer of the Declaration of Independence (d. 1794)
 February 25 – Karl Wilhelm Ramler, German poet (d. 1798)
 February 26 – Nicolas-Joseph Cugnot, French steam vehicle pioneer (d. 1804)
 March 6 – Henry Benedict Stuart, Italian-born cardinal, Jacobite claimant to the British throne (d. 1807)
 March 17 – Lachlan McIntosh, Scottish-born American military and political leader (d. 1806)
 March 20 – Abdul Hamid I, Ottoman Sultan (d. 1789)
 March 24
 Samuel Ashe, Governor of North Carolina (d. 1813)
 Thomas Cushing, American Continental Congressman (d. 1788)
 March 28 – Andrew Kippis, English non-conformist clergyman, biographer (d. 1795)
 April 2 – Giacomo Casanova, Italian adventurer, writer (d. 1798)
 April 6 – Pasquale Paoli, Corsican patriot, military leader (d. 1807)
 April 23 – Gerard Majella, Italian Catholic lay brother and saint (d. 1755)
 April 25 – Augustus Keppel, 1st Viscount Keppel, British admiral (d. 1786)
 May 12 – Louis Philippe I, Duke of Orléans, French soldier, writer (d. 1785)
 May 25 – Samuel Ward, American politician (d. 1776)
 June 29 – Maria Teresa Cybo-Malaspina, Duchess of Massa, Italian ruler (d. 1790)
 July 1 – Rhoda Delaval, English portrait painter (d. 1757)
 July 4
 Jean-Baptiste Luton Durival, French historian, diplomat and Encyclopédiste (d. 1810)
 Jean-Baptiste Donatien de Vimeur, comte de Rochambeau, French soldier (d. 1807)
 July 24 – John Newton, English cleric and hymnist (d. 1807)
 August 21 – Jean-Baptiste Greuze, French painter (d. 1805)
 August 29 – Charles Townshend, English politician (d. 1767)
 September 5 – Jean-Étienne Montucla, French mathematician (d. 1799)
 September 12 – Guillaume Le Gentil, French astronomer (d. 1792)
 September 16 
 Nicolas Desmarest, French geologist (d. 1815)
 Anna Barbara Gignoux, German industrialist (d. 1796)
 September 24 – Arthur Guinness, Irish brewer (d. 1803)
 September 29 – Robert Clive, British general, statesman (d. 1774)
 October 12 – Étienne Louis Geoffroy, French pharmacist, entomologist (d. 1810)
 October 21 – Franz Moritz Graf von Lacy, Austrian field marshal (d. 1801)
 December 11 – George Mason, American founding father (d. 1792)
 December 18 – Johann Salomo Semler, German historian, Bible commentator (d. 1791)
 December 23 – Ahmad Shah Bahadur, 14th Mughal Emperor (d. 1775)
 date unknown – Magdalena Dávalos y Maldonado, Ecuadorian scholar, socialite (d. 1806)

Deaths 

 January 6 – Chikamatsu Monzaemon, Japanese dramatist (b. 1653)
 January 26 – Sulkhan-Saba Orbeliani, Georgian prince (b. 1658)
 January 29 – Nuno Álvares Pereira de Melo, 1st Duke of Cadaval, Portuguese nobleman and statesman (b. 1638)
 February 7 – Johann Philipp Krieger, German Baroque composer (b. 1649)
 February 8 – Emperor Peter I of Russia (b. 1672)
 March 2 – José Benito de Churriguera, Spanish architect, sculptor (b. 1665)
 March 10 – John Conyers, English politician (b. 1650)
 March 30 – René de Froulay de Tessé, French Marshal and diplomat (b. 1648)
 April 8 – John Wise, English clergyman (b. 1652)
 April 12 – Giovanni Battista Foggini, Italian artist (b. 1652)
 April 25 – Paul de Rapin, French historian (b. 1661)
 May 22 – Robert Molesworth, 1st Viscount Molesworth, Irish politician (b. 1656)
 May 24 – Jonathan Wild, English criminal (b. 1682)
 May 31 – Erik Carlsson Sjöblad, Swedish governor, admiral, and baron (b. 1647)
 June 29 
 Arai Hakuseki, Japanese poet, politician, and writer (b. 1657)
 Juan Manuel Fernández Pacheco, 8th Duke of Escalona, Spanish aristocrat (b. 1650)
 July 11 – Salomon Franck, German lawyer, scientist, poet (b. 1659)
 July 17 – Thomas King, English and British soldier, MP for Queenborough, lieutenant-governor of Sheerness (b. before 1660?)
 September 16 – Antoine V de Gramont, French military leader (b. 1672)
 October 10 
 Francesco del Giudice, Italian Catholic cardinal (b. 1647)
 Philippe de Rigaud Vaudreuil, Governor-General of New France
 October 11 – Hans Herr, Swiss-born Mennonite bishop (b. 1639)
 October 16 – Ralph Thoresby, British historian (b. 1658)
 October 24 – Alessandro Scarlatti, Italian composer (b. 1660)
 November 20 – William, Landgrave of Hesse-Rotenburg (from 1683) (b. 1648)
 December 7 – Florent Carton Dancourt, French dramatist, actor (b. 1661)
 December 10 – Nicolaas Hartsoeker, Dutch mathematician and physicist (b. 1656)
 date unknown
 Giuseppe Mazzuoli, Italian sculptor (b. 1644)
 José Mora, Spanish sculptor (b. 1638)
 Nguyễn Phúc Chu, Vietnamese ruler (b. 1675)
 Petar Blagojević, Serbian peasant, alleged vampire
 Alicia D'Anvers, English poet (b. 1688)
 probable
 Leendert Hasenbosch, Dutch castaway on Ascension Island (b. c. 1695)
 Keaweʻīkekahialiʻiokamoku, ruler of Hawaii

References